Saco (YTB-796) was a United States Navy  named for Saco, Maine. She was the third navy ship to bear the name.

Construction

The contract for Saco was awarded 15 June 1967. She was laid down on 12 January 1968 at Marinette, Wisconsin, by Marinette Marine and launched 3 July 1968.

Operational history
Placed in service on 14 September 1968, Saco was assigned to Naval Station Guam. She served there until reassignment to Naval Station Long Beach, California, where she served for the remainder of her career.

Stricken from the Navy List 9 June 2004, Saco was scrapped 30 May 2005.

References

External links
 

 

Natick-class large harbor tugs
Ships built by Marinette Marine
1968 ships